Mohammad Aas was an Indian politician. He was a Member of Parliament, representing Bihar in the Rajya Sabha the upper house of India's Parliament as a member of the Janata Dal later Janata Dal United.

References

Rajya Sabha members from Bihar
Janata Dal politicians
Janata Dal (United) politicians
Possibly living people
Year of birth missing